Sanam Naraghi Anderlini, MBE (29 October 1967) is a British-Iranian author and Founder and Executive Director of the International Civil Society Action Network (ICAN). She has been a peace strategist working on conflicts, crises and violent extremism and as a consultant to the United Nations on the subject of women and conflict. Naraghi Anderlini joined LSE as Director of the Centre for Women, Peace and Security in December 2019.

Early life and education

Naraghi-Anderlini was born in Iran and attended the American Community School until the age of 6. She moved to London at age 11 and was educated at the Round Square, Cobham Hall Girls' School. She received her BA from Oxford Brookes and an MPhil. in Social Anthropology from Cambridge University. She speaks four languages and has identical twin daughters. Sattareh Farman Farmaian, the author of Daughters of Persia, and the founder of social work in Iran was her maternal aunt and an early inspiration for her career.

Career
In 2000, Naraghi Anderlini was a civil society leader and drafter of UN Security Council Resolution 1325 on women, peace and security.

In 2011 she was the first Senior Expert on Gender and Inclusion to the UN's Mediation Standby Team, working on Somalia, Libya and Syria. In 2014 ICAN and UN Women hosted the first Better Peace Forum to review women's participation in ongoing peace processes. This led to the development of ICAN's Better Peace Initiative (BPI) and Better Peace Tool. Under the leadership of Naraghi Anderlini, ICAN has developed the Innovative Peace Fund (IPF) - a multi-donor fund to channel resources to women-led peacebuilding organisations. 

She served as a board member of National Iranian American Council (NIAC) for approximately 3 years ending in 2018. She has also previously held posts at International Alert (London), Forum for Early Action and Early Warning (London), and was director of the Women's Policy Commission of Women Waging Peace (Washington). Her work on gender and conflict has involved her with women peace activists in Sri Lanka, Nepal, Liberia, and elsewhere for the U.N. Population Fund, the U.N. Development Programme, and UN Women.

Her appointments include serving on the Steering Board of the UK's National Action Plan on Women, Peace and Security, the Commonwealth's Panel of Experts on CVE and UNDP's Civil Society Advisory Council. Her profile was featured in the New York Times in October 2020.

Writing 
Naraghi Anderlini is the author of Women Building Peace, What they do why it matters (Reinner, 2007). She is coauthor, with Kumar Rupesinghe, of Civil Wars, Civil Peace: An Introduction to Conflict Resolution (Pluto Press, 1998), What the Women Say: Participation and UNSCR 1325 (ICAN/MIT), and articles for openDemocracy, Foreign Policy, The Guardian, Ms. Magazine, Foreign Affairs, and others. Her books and papers have been cited extensively by other writers on the topic of conflict and gender.

References

External links 
 Biography at Naropa University
 Institute for the Study of Diplomacy, Georgetown University
 Sanam Anderlini

1967 births
Living people